This is a list of the first women lawyer(s) and judge(s) in each country. It includes the year in which the women were admitted to practice law (in parentheses). Also included are the first women in their country to achieve a certain distinction such as obtaining a law degree. The list is divided by continent:

 List of first women lawyers and judges in Africa
 List of first women lawyers and judges in Asia
 List of first women lawyers and judges in Europe
 List of first women lawyers and judges in North America
List of first women lawyers and judges in Oceania
 List of first women lawyers and judges in South America

See also 
 Justice ministry
 List of first women lawyers and judges in the United States
 Timeline of women lawyers
 Timeline of women lawyers in the United States
 Women in law

Lists of women by occupation and nationality
 
 
Women lawyers and judges
Lists of women by occupation
Lists of female office-holders